Dennis the Menace and Gnasher (originally known as Dennis and Gnasher in its first series) is an animated television series which was aired on the CBBC Channel. Based on the original comic strips from The Beano, it features the adventures of the rebellious schoolboy Dennis the Menace and his dog Gnasher. The programme is aimed for ages 6–12 and commenced on 7 September 2009 and ended on 2 March 2010 after 52 episodes.
A second series was started at 3.45 pm on 8 July 2013 on the CBBC Channel. It was preceded by Dennis and Gnasher which aired in 1996 and a new series in 1998.

Production
The new series features the return of 10-year-old Dennis, Gnasher, Mum, Dad, Curly and Pie-Face and also features the introduction of Dennis' little sister Bea, as well as several original characters like Athena. The production shots also showed Dennis' treehouse with a more menacing design. Screenshots and an episode can be found at the production company website, Red Kite Animation.

Images of the characters and production were featured in The Beano's 70-year anniversary.

The show was a co-production between Red Kite Animation in Scotland and Sticky Pictures in Australia. Consisting of 52 11-minute segments, the animation is directed by Glenn Kirkpatrick with Executive Producers Donna Andrews (Sticky Pictures) and Ken Anderson (Red Kite) and producers Jane Schneider (Sticky Pictures) and Sueann Smith (Red Kite). Jane Ubrien, Sarah Aubrey, Jimmy Hibbert and Keith Scott are confirmed to be voice actors for the series.

Changes
A number of changes have been made to the original format compared to the comics and previous television series. As well as being updated and modernised, Dennis lost his catapult and peashooter and no longer deliberately causes trouble., In addition, Walter, Dennis's main rival, was made more masculine, removing elements like his pink-coloured pyjamas, a small poodle, effeminate voice and his friends being mainly girls. There were fears that Dennis could be seen as homophobic or at the least bullying Walter about his effeminacy. A Telegraph article claimed that the show had been toned down for reasons of "political correctness". However the producers have stated that "Dennis will not lose his sense of fun."

Cartoonist Lew Stringer has refuted on his blog the political correctness claims made by some areas of the media, especially the reports that Dennis will no longer use catapults and Gnasher will no longer bite people. Describing these claims as "another 'political correctness gone mad' myth embellished by the media", he has posted videos showing that the show has not been softened up to the extent that the media has reported.

Despite, or possibly because, of these changes, the show was received positively by the mainstream audience and a small number of professional critics, and the show was a ratings winner on the CBBC Channel at launch.

For the production of Series 2, it was decided that the series would change yet again. 'The Menace' returned to the title 'Dennis the Menace and Gnasher' and his personality changed slightly in tribute to the classic comics.

The designs of Dennis' parents also changed to match up to the weekly Beano comic. The style of animation was also adjusted. Pie Face and Walter's voice actors have also been changed. He also got his catapult and peashooter back and uses them directly at them.

Characters 

 Dennis: A mischievous 10-year-old child, who loves pranking people.
 Bea: Dennis’ youngest sister.
 Sandra: Dennis and Bea’s mother. She often scolds Dennis when he's doing something wrong.
 Dennis Sr.: Dennis and Bea's father. He is very strict.
 Walter: Dennis’ next-door neighbor and butt of many of Dennis' pranks or jokes.

Episodes

Telecast and home media
The show began airing on The Hub in the U.S. on the same day the network launched on 10 October 2010. It stopped airing on 10 December 2013. The programme also airs in Australia on Channel Nine and later on ABC3. The programme also began airing on Disney XD and Nickelodeon Sonic in India. It started airing on Disney Channel Asia on 14 May 2011 until today's years.

Five DVDs have been released and all of series 2 was available to stream on Netflix until 2017.

DVD releases

Accolades

Book

On 6 February 2014, a book called The Diary of Dennis the Menace was released to celebrate The Beano's 75-year anniversary. The second book Beanotown Battle was released on 1 May 2014. The third book Rollercoaster Riot was released on 7 August 2014. Steven Butler wrote the books. Butler also released audiobooks for the first three titles. The fourth book Bash Street Bandit was released on 5 February 2015. The fifth book Canine Carnage was released on 2 July 2015. The sixth book The Great Escape was released on 4 February 2016.

References

External links

Dennis and Gnasher

2009 Australian television series debuts
2013 Australian television series endings
2000s Australian animated television series
2010s Australian animated television series
2009 British television series debuts
2000s British children's television series
2010s British children's television series
2013 British television series endings
2000s British animated television series
2010s British animated television series
Australian children's animated comedy television series
British children's animated comedy television series
English-language television shows
The Beano
BBC children's television shows
Nine Network original programming
Television shows based on comics
Animated television series about children
Animated television series about dogs
Dennis the Menace and Gnasher